Sir Herbert John Todd (1893-1985) was a British civil servant who served as resident for the Madras States from 1943 to 1945.

References
 

British people in colonial India
1893 births
1985 deaths
Date of death missing
Date of birth missing